The West Virginia League was a Class D level minor baseball league that played during the 1910 season. It featured four teams, all from West Virginia - the Clarksburg Bees of Clarksburg, the Fairmont Champions of Fairmont the Grafton team based in Grafton and the Mannington Drillers based in Mannington.

The league disbanded on July 5 after Grafton disbanded. In the shortened season, Fairmont finished first in the standings with a 37-18 record, while Mannington was second with a 33-21 mark, Grafton was third at 20-30 and Clarksburg was last with a 14-35 record. Future major leaguer Everett Scott played in the league.

Cities represented
 Clarksburg, WV: Clarksburg Bees 1910 
 Fairmont, WV: Fairmont Champions 1910 
 Grafton, WV: Grafton 1910 
 Mannington, WV: Mannington Drillers 1910

Standings & statistics

1910 West Virginia League
schedule
 The league disbanded July 5 after Grafton disbanded.

References

Defunct minor baseball leagues in the United States
Baseball leagues in West Virginia
Sports leagues established in 1910
1910 establishments in West Virginia
1910 disestablishments in West Virginia